The Dyanyshka (Deeniske), also known as Kobycha, is a river in the Kobyaysky District of the Sakha Republic (Yakutia), Russia. There are no settlements in the area of the Dyanyshka.

The river is located in the Ust-Vilyui Natural Park area. Whitefish, lenok, pike and taimen, among other species, are abundant in the waters of the river. In the International scale of river difficulty the Dyanyshka is a Class II - IV destination for rafting and kayaking.

Course
The Dyanyshka is a right tributary of the Lena and flows across mountainous terrain all along its upper course. The river flows roughly southwestwards all along its course cutting across the Selenchan Range and flanking the northwestern end of the Tagindzhin, Muosuchan and Bygyn ranges through a wide valley in its middle course with the northern end of the Kuturgin Range rising not far off its left bank. 

The river meanders and splits in slow-flowing arms already  from its mouth. In its last stretch it flows across a flat area at the edge of the Central Yakutian Lowland where there are many small lakes and marshes. Finally the Dyanyshka joins the right bank of the Lena  from its mouth. The river freezes yearly in mid-October and opens in late May or early June. It freezes to the bottom in its upper course.

River Dyanyshka has 54 tributaries with a length of more than 10 km.

See also
List of rivers of Russia

References

External links 
 Ust-Vilyui Natural Park
 Geography - Yakutia Organized

Rivers of the Sakha Republic
Verkhoyansk Range
Central Yakutian Lowland